A Festival is a type of observance in the Churches of the Anglican Communion, considered to be less significant than a Principal Feast or Principal Holy Day, but more significant than a Lesser Festival or Commemoration. In Common Worship, each Festival is provided with a collect and an indication of liturgical colour.

Fixed Festivals
1 January: The Naming and Circumcision of Jesus
25 January: The Conversion of Paul
19 March: Joseph of Nazareth
23 April: George, Martyr, Patron of England
25 April: Mark the Evangelist
1 May: Philip and James, Apostles
14 May: Matthias the Apostle
31 May: The Visit of the Blessed Virgin Mary to Elizabeth
11 June: Barnabas the Apostle
24 June: The Birth of John the Baptist
29 June: Peter and Paul, Apostles
3 July: Thomas the Apostle
22 July: Mary Magdalene
25 July: James the Apostle
6 August: The Transfiguration of Our Lord
15 August: The Blessed Virgin Mary
24 August: Bartholomew the Apostle
14 September: Holy Cross Day                                         
21 September: Matthew, Apostle and Evangelist
29 September: Michael and All Angels
18 October: Luke the Evangelist
28 October: Simon and Jude, Apostles
30 November: Andrew the Apostle
26 December: Stephen, Deacon, First Martyr
27 December: John, Apostle and Evangelist
28 December: The Holy Innocents

Moveable Festivals
The Baptism of Christ – when the Epiphany is celebrated between 2 and 6 January, on the following Sunday; when the Epiphany is celebrated on 7 or 8 January, on the following Monday
The Day of Thanksgiving for the Institution of Holy Communion (Corpus Christi) – Thursday after Trinity Sunday (observance optional)
Christ the King – Sunday next before Advent

See also

Principal Feast
Principal Holy Day
Lesser Festival
Commemoration (observance)

Church of England festivals